Sir Theodore Samuel Adams (1885-1961) was a British colonial civil servant.

Adams graduated from All Souls College, University of Oxford and entered the British colonial civil service. His first post was as a cadet in the Federated Malay States in 1908. He then had a succession of more senior appointments in Malaya before becoming Chief Commissioner of the Northern Provinces of Nigeria from 1937.

Adams played a part in the Selangor succession dispute.

References

External links
Portraits of Adams at the National Portrait Gallery.

1885 births
1961 deaths
Alumni of All Souls College, Oxford
British colonial governors and administrators in Africa
British people in British Nigeria
British people in British Malaya